Adolf Emil Büchner (December 7, 1826 in Osterfeld – June 9, 1908 in Erfurt) was a German conductor and bandmaster. He wrote a number of compositions, including operas, chamber music, choral works, and symphonies.

Life 
Büchner's parents encouraged his musical interests from a young age. He attended the Leipzig Conservatory between April 1843 and Easter 1846, when he graduated. He was the ninth student to attend the newly formed conservatory, and was exempt from paying tuition. After his studies he worked as a piano teacher in Leipzig until 1856. After numerous engagements as a conductor, he was from 1865 the conductor of the Meiningen Court Orchestra in the city of Meiningen.

Büchner and the court orchestra performed with Franz Liszt in 1867 in Meiningen, at the festival of the "General German Music Society". In 1876, at the request of Richard Wagner,  he introduced the main contingent of the festival orchestra at the first Bayreuth Festival, which many years later participated in the Festival. As Kapellmeister, Büchner brought the orchestra a significant increase in quality. In 1880 he gave his successor, Hans von Bülow, the chapel next to a known top European orchestra.

In 1881, Büchner retired and moved to Erfurt where, from 1882 to 1898, he led the "Sollerschen Musikverein". On his 80th birthday, he was granted the title of professor by Georg II, Duke of Saxe-Meiningen.

Büchner was a member of the Leipzig Masonic Lodge, Minerva.

Works

Songs
op. 6. 
no. 1. "Der Gruss" 
op. 18. Fünf Lieder für Mezzo-Sopran (oder Bariton) mit Pianoforte
no. 1. "Sehnsucht" (Text: Emanuel von Geibel) 
no. 2. "An einem lichten Morgen" (Text: Hermann Rollett) 
no. 3. "Ich sah den Wald sich färben" (Text: Emanuel von Geibel) 
no. 4. "Nachtgesang" (Text: Robert Reinick) 
no. 5. "Die stille Wasserrose" (Text: Emanuel von Geibel)
 op. 20. Vier Lieder für Mezzo-Sopran (oder Bariton) mit Pianoforte
no. 1. "Ave Maria" 
no. 2. "Ich bin geliebt" 
no. 3. "Osterlied" (Text: Adolf Böttger) 
no. 4. "O wär' ich ein Stern" 
op. 25. Drei Lieder für Sopr. (od. Ten.) mit Pianoforte
no. 1. "Frühling" (Text: Friedrich Martin von Bodenstedt after Mirza Shafi Vazeh) 
op. 28. Sechs Lieder für 1 Singstimme mit Pianoforte
no. 1. "Ich möchte mich in Rosenduft berauschen" 
no. 2. "Der Mondstrahl fiel in der Lilie Thau" (Text: Adolf Böttger) 
no. 3. "Mein Stern" (Text: August Heinrich Hoffmann von Fallersleben) 
no. 4. "Die Erde liegt so wüst und leer" (Text: Adolf Böttger) 
no. 5. "O Welt, du bist so wunderschön" (Text: Julius Rodenberg) 
no. 6. "Huldigung" (Text: Hermann Rollett) 
op. 29. Vier Lieder für 1 Singstimme mit Pianoforte
no. 1. "Willst du mein eigen sein" 
no. 2. "O blick mich an!" 
no. 3. "Die Haideblume von Tiefensee' 
no. 4. "Mir träumte von einem Königskind" (Text: Heinrich Heine)

Notable students
Carl Friedemann (1862–1952)

Sources
 Encyclopedia Erfurt, 99084 Erfurt
 Meininger Museums, 98617 Meiningen

1826 births
1908 deaths
People from Burgenlandkreis
German composers
German conductors (music)
German male conductors (music)
19th-century German musicians
19th-century German male musicians